The National Dairy Development Board (NDDB) is a statutory body set up by an Act of the Parliament of India. It is under the ownership of the Ministry of Fisheries, Animal Husbandry and Dairying of the Government of India. The main office is in Anand, Gujarat with regional offices throughout the country. NDDB's subsidiaries include Indian Dairy Machinery Company Limited, Mother Dairy and Indian Immunologicals Limited, Hyderabad. The Board was created to finance and support producer-owned and controlled organisations. Its programmes and activities seek to strengthen farmer cooperatives and support national policies that are favourable to the growth of such institutions. Cooperative principles and cooperative strategies are fundamental to the board's efforts.

Meenesh Shah was appointed the Chairman of NDDB in 2021.

Establishment

The NDDB was founded by Dr. Verghese Kurien in 1965. The prime minister of India at that time, Lal Bahadur Shastri, wished to replicate the success of the Kaira Cooperative Milk Producers' Union (Amul) across India. Kurien had been instrumental in Amul's success, where he had instituted a producer-run, democratic farmers' cooperative model. Until this time, India's own dairy industry was limited in its capacity and dominated by traders who set pricing. Marginal milk producers reaped little reward in this system, and the country's foreign exchange was expended in European and New Zealand dairy industries, purchasing dairy imports to fill the shortfall. 

Between the start of the NDDB's landmark project in 1970, Operation Flood and its founder's retirement in 1998, India quadrupled its milk production, with the board's technical and organisational support. By then India had 81,000 dairy cooperatives, formed with the assistance of NDDB on their "Amul" pattern. In 1998, India became the largest milk producer in the world, when its output surpassed that of the United States. The country remains a major dairy-producing nation.

Initiatives
In 2012, under the national dairy plan (NDP) programme, NDDB had initiated plans to boost dairy farming by targeting 40,000 villages in 14 major milk producing states including Punjab. The project was aimed at covering about 2.7 million milch animals in these states.

In October 2020, the NDDB launched a "manure management initiative" at the Mujkuva Dairy Cooperative Society (DCS) in Anand district, wherein biogas plants are installed by the dairy farmers outside their residences for producing gas to be used as cooking fuel. In addition to biogas, bio-slurry produced from these biogas plants will also be used by the farmers in their own fields for soil conditioning. Surplus bio-slurry can be sold to other farmers or converted into organic fertilisers.

In 2000, in accordance of the plans of NDDB to reach out to more states, it signed a Memorandum of Understanding with the administration of Ladakh to promote dairying and rural livelihoods in the newly formed union territory.

In one innovative approach, NDDB, in collaboration with All India Radio (AIR), launched Radio Samvad—an awareness series on radio for dairy farmers of the Vidarbha and Marathwada regions. , a twice weekly, 30-minute episode was broadcast from Nagpur, Jalgaon, Aurangabad, Osmanabad and Nanded radio stations on subjects related to scientific dairy animal management. Subject experts from NDDB conduct the sessions.<ref name

See also
Mother Dairy
Sudha, Bihar State Milk Co-operative Federation
Nandini, Karnataka Milk Federation
OMFED, Odisha State Cooperative Milk Producers' Federation
Vita, Haryana Dairy Development Cooperative Federation Ltd
Milma, Kerala Co-operative Milk Marketing Federation
Aavin, Tamil Nadu Cooperative Milk Producers Federation Limited
Amul, Gujarat Cooperative Milk Marketing Federation Ltd. (GCMMF)
Amrita Patel

References

External links
 National Dairy Development Board

Economy of Gujarat
Executive branch of the government of India
Dairy farming in India
Shastri administration
Dairy organizations
Agricultural organisations based in India
1965 establishments in Gujarat
Government agencies established in 1965